The Mekong-Mamberamo linguistic area is a linguistic area proposed by David Gil (2015). It combines the Mainland Southeast Asia linguistic area with the languages of the Nusantara archipelago and western New Guinea. The linguistic area covers Mainland Southeast Asia, Malaysia (including both peninsular Malaysia and Borneo), and all of Indonesia except for the parts of central New Guinea that are located east of the Mamberamo River.

Features
Gil (2015:271) lists 17 features that are characteristic of the Mekong-Mamberamo linguistic area.
passing gesture
repeated dental clicks expressing amazement
conventionalized greeting with ‘where’
‘eye day’ > ‘sun’ lexicalization
d/t place-of-articulation asymmetry
numeral classifiers
verby adjectives
basic SVO word order
iamitive perfects
‘give’ causatives
low differentiation of adnominal attributive constructions
weakly developed grammatical voice
isolating word structure
short words
low grammatical-morpheme density
optional thematic-role flagging
optional tense–aspect–mood marking

References

Languages of Southeast Asia
Linguistic typology
Sprachbund